A Deputy Secretary-General is a deputy to a Secretary General.

Deputy Secretary-General may refer specifically to:

 United Nations Deputy Secretary-General
 Commonwealth Deputy Secretary-General
 Secretary General of NATO#Deputy Secretary General